The 2019 Valdosta State Blazers football team represented Valdosta State University as a member of the Gulf South Conference (GSC) during the 2019 NCAA Division II football season. They were led by first-year head coach Gary Goff. The Blazers played their home games at Bazemore–Hyder Stadium in Valdosta, Georgia.

Valdosta State entered the 2019 season as defending NCAA Division II champions and the favorite to win the conference. The Blazers finished the regular season undefeated with an overall record of 10–0 and a mark of 8–0 in GSC play, winning the conference title. In the NCAA Division II football playoffs, Valdosta State was upset in the second round by eventual national champion West Florida.

Previous season
The Blazers finished the 2018 season 14–0, 8–0 in Gulf South Conference (GSC) play, to finish first in the conference standings. The team won their four national title after defeating Ferris State in the 2018 NCAA Division II Football Championship Game.

Schedule

Rankings

References

Valdosta State
Valdosta State Blazers football seasons
Gulf South Conference football champion seasons
Valdosta State Blazers football